Tormentic acid is a bio-active isolate of Luehea divaricata and Agrimonia eupatoria. Tormentic acid derivatives have been synthesized and researched.

External links
 Tormentic acid derivatives: synthesis and apoptotic activity

Grewioideae
Rosoideae